Niebüll (Mooring North Frisian: Naibel) is a town in the district of Nordfriesland, in Schleswig-Holstein, Germany. It is situated near the North Sea coast and the border with Denmark, approx. 35 km northwest of Husum.

International relations

Niebüll is twinned with:
 Płoty, Poland
 Malmesbury, England

Notable people
 Momme Andresen (1857–1951), born in Risum, educated in Niebüll, industrial chemist who made practical developments in photography including the invention of Rodinal
Carl Ludwig Jessen (1833–1917), painter of North Frisian daily life.
Carsta Löck (1902–1993), actress
Max Hansen (1908–1990), Waffen SS Standartenführer
 Bernd Raffelhüschen (born 1957), economist

References

Towns in Schleswig-Holstein
Nordfriesland